The Comboyne was a wooden screw steamer built in 1911 at Tuncurry, that was wrecked when it struck an object whilst carrying timber to Wollongong and was lost at approximately  off Bass Point, Shellharbour, New South Wales on 27 November 1920.

Ship description and construction
The Comboyne was started to be built by John Wright (Snr), the founder of the town of Tuncurry and the ship building industry it became known for. He died in 1910; his son Ernest continued the business and finished the construction of Comboyne for the Allen Taylor & Company.

Ship service history

Launch and finishing
The finished hull of the Comboyne was launched from the Messrs. Allen Taylor and Co shipbuilding yard Friday 16 June 1911, intended for the Camden Haven trade, and witnessed by a large gathering from all parts of the local district. The hull was then towed to Sydney on Monday 26 June 1911 for the fitting of the boilers and engines fitted by Messrs. Chapman and Co by the Allen Taylor and Co owned steamer Tuncurry.

After fit-out the new twin-screw steamer Comboyne, owned by Allen Taylor and Co., Ltd., in partnership with Messrs. Wright Bros., left Sydney for Camden Haven on her maiden voyage on the evening of Wednesday 6 September 1911. The vessel was described as having been built faithfully of local hardwood with compound engines having cylinders of  x  diameter and a stroke of  producing , with a boiler of  x , and a hatch  x  with electric light having been fitted throughout. She had a steam windlass, McFarlane's patent winches, and all the latest appliances. The vessel was specially adapted for the carriage of passengers, timber, butter, and fish, and was specially designed for bar and harbour work, whilst being able to carry at least 230 tons on the light draft of 7 ft. The captain was Richard Lucy, late of the Wandra. Engineer was T. Dun, also of the Wandra.

September 1912: sinking and refloating

On Sunday 8 September 1912:

The steamer Comboyne, whilst trying to put into Port Kembla Harbor at 3 o'clock in the morning, struck the end of the eastern breakwater, and a big hole was knocked in her side. The water poured in, and the mate, who was on the bridge, decided to run for the beach. The captain by this time was on deck, and seeing the vessel fast settling down ordered the crew of 14 into the boats.

They had no sooner entered the boats than the Comboyne sank. The captain was still on board, and owing to the darkness was unable to make out where the boat was. He then struck out for the shore, which he reached after having been over half an hour in the water. The crew landed safely and made their way to the Electrolytic Company's works.

The vessel sank in about 40 ft. of water. The stewardess (Miss E. Birkenshaw) was asleep at the time the vessel struck, and was only just able to escape in her night dress. The escape of all on board is regarded as wonderful, seeing that the vessel sank within a couple of minutes of the time of striking. Captain Lacey said he could not account for the accident. Whilst swimming ashore he thought he was done for, but he struggled on and managed to reach land.

About 2 ft. of the funnel is showing out of the water, and arrangements are to (be made at once for refloating).

On 2 October the Marine Court inquiry found that the accident had been caused by default of the mate, Joseph Daley, in not calling the master earlier.

The vessel was later refloated, subsequently towed to Sydney for repairs and again made seaworthy, and resumed running in the coastal service in late October.

October 1912: Stuck fast and towed off by a tug
After the vessel's September experience in Wollongong, it was brought to Sydney where it was placed on Shorts floating dock, and repairs were effected. Once these were completed the Comboyne left Sydney on Saturday 26 October 1912 on the first trip since the mishap. Ill luck appears to have attended her again, however, as she had almost reached her destination when it struck the sand spit off the northern breakwater at Camden Haven Heads on the night of Sunday, 27 October 1912.

The tug Unique was in attendance, with the local harbour pilot where they were told that there was no necessity to tow the vessel off. The tug returned to its anchorage, but was later whistled for by the Comboyne, which was then fast on the spit. The tug spent nearly an hour towing the steamer off.

The captains asserted that the leading lights on the breakwater were wrongly placed, and were misleading.

October 1913: Aground again
While crossing the bar Laurieton at midnight Sunday 5 October 1913 the steamer Comboyne again become stuck fast, this time on the south spit of the bar, and remained fast there until approximately 8.30 am Monday morning. Hawsers had been put out at 6 am, and, after strenuous work, the steamer was successfully refloated. No serious damage was sustained, as the sea was moderate through the night.

May 1914: Aground on the Camden Haven Bar
Wednesday 20 May 1914 Comboyne again crossing the Camden Haven Bar was held fast with the vessel expected to be floated off with the night's high tide.

March 1915: Mechanical troubles
When leaving Sydney on the evening of Monday 22 March 1915 the steamer Comboyne was forced to return to port owing to mechanical trouble. The vessel had cleared the Sydney Heads shortly after 11 pm for Camden Haven. When it was north of Sydney a breakdown of the port engine occurred. The Comboyne was able to be turned round and with the aid of the starboard engine was able to proceed slowly back to port, arriving at about 6 am on Tuesday. After receiving the necessary repairs that morning the vessel sailed again for Camden Haven.

1915: Discovery of a murder

On Tuesday 21 September 1915 the Comboyne, while proceeding up the Camden Haven River, caused a man's body to come to the surface. The body was recovered by the police, who found that it had been weighted down with an anchor (weighing 1½ cwt ). The head had been battered, both jaws being broken, as was the nose. It was supposed that the man had been murdered.

The man, named Purcell, had lived at Hunter's Hill formerly but had arrived at Laurieton in April, with a companion, to become a fisherman. Towards the end of August Purcell had disappeared, but no alarm was raised, as it was thought he had gone to a neighbouring town. The police then arrested his companion.

1918: Twice aground in Narooma
The Comboyne twice (February and March) went aground on the bar crossing at Narooma.

1918: Replacement of Comboyne Kelson
In August 1918 it was found on an examination of the steamer Comboyne that it would be necessary to replace or repair her keelson, and in order to do this it was incumbent to remove the whole top structure, including the bridge, funnel, and deck cabins.

In the ordinary course this would have been done by piecemeal removal of the superstructure, and would have taken some weeks to remove and replace. At this time a Mr Waugh had just built the steam winches Hawk a 100-tonne floating sheerleg and it was decided to use this on its first big job. The super structure of the Comboyne was unbolted from the deck, large balks of timber were placed athwart for the purpose of raising, and others fore and aft as supports, and the whole of this part of the vessel, weighing 35 tons, was lifted bodily off the boat, and placed on a lighter. The boiler, of some 20-odd tons, and the two sets of engines were also taken out of the Comboyne by the powerful lifting appliances of the Balmain Company,

The hull of the Comboyne was towed into dock, to have false keelsons put in her. On the following Friday, the Comboyne, newly arrived from dock, lay alongside a Pyrmont wharf, ready to be united to her vitals, which had been abstracted. The boiler and engines were already in place, and between 10 and 11 o'clock, out of the foggy misty, rain-soaked distance, came the punt, looking, with the funnel, bridge, and cabins of the Comboyne, just like a steamer herself.

The Hawk having drawn out from the side of the Comboyne, the punt dropped neatly in between the two, the huge boat six-fall tackle was hooked on to the slings, and in less than half an hour the whole of the top of the vessel had again been fitted into its old station on the steamer. All that remained was to screw the deck bolts into place again. Thus, half a day's work, putting back boiler, engines, top structure, with the aid of this new giant, took the place of at least a week's work under the ordinary conditions.

See images (Chase up)

Shipwreck event
On Saturday, 27 November 1920 the vessel reportedly struck a submerged rock or a floating object.

While steaming off Bass Point, near Kiama. She was carrying a full cargo of timber, and was at the time about a mile from the shore. The bump caused the vessel at once to leak very badly, and the pumps proved unable to cope with the water. An attempt was made to beach the Comboyne, but she took a dangerous list, and began to settle down. The crew therefore took to the boats, and soon afterwards the vessel disappeared. The men in the boats went to rest till daylight, as they were very tired after their efforts on the Comboyne. When the fog lifted they hailed a passing coaster, which picked them up and carried them to Kiama. They lost all their belongings in the Comboyne.

Further reading
Wrecks on the New South Wales Coast. By Loney, J. K. (Jack Kenneth), 1925–1995 Oceans Enterprises 1993 
Australian shipwrecks Vol. 4 1901–1986 By Loney, J. K. (Jack Kenneth), 1925–1995. Portarlington Vic. Marine History Publications, 1987 910.4530994 LON
Australian shipwrecks Vol. 5 Update 1986 By Loney, J. K. (Jack Kenneth), 1925–1995. Portarlington Vic. Marine History Publications, 1991 910.4530994 LON

External links
 
 
 Encyclopaedia of Australian Shipwrecks - New South Wales Shipwrecks

References

Shipwrecks of the Illawarra Region
Ships built in New South Wales
1911 ships
Maritime incidents in 1920
1920 in Australia
1901 – World War I ships of Australia
Interwar period ships of Australia
Merchant ships of Australia
Wooden steamships of Australia